Must is an Estonian surname meaning black. Notable people with the surname include:

Aadu Must (born 1951), Estonian historian and politician
Ivar Must (born 1961), Estonian composer
Kullo Must (1911–1987), Estonian film producer
Mari Must (1920–2008), Estonian linguist 
Raul Must (born 1987), Estonian badminton player

Estonian-language surnames